The Wilderness Society is an American non-profit land conservation organization that is dedicated to protecting natural areas and federal public lands in the United States. They advocate for the designation of federal wilderness areas and other protective designations, such as for national monuments. They support balanced uses of public lands, and advocate for federal politicians to enact various land conservation and balanced land use proposals. The Wilderness Society also engages in a number of ancillary activities, including education and outreach, and hosts one of the most valuable collections of Ansel Adams photographs at their headquarters in Washington, D.C.

The Wilderness Society specializes in issues involving lands under the management of federal agencies; such lands include national parks, national forests, national wildlife refuges, and areas overseen by the Bureau of Land Management. In the early 21st century, the society has been active in fighting recent political efforts to reduce protection for America's roadless and undeveloped lands and wildlife.

The organization was instrumental in the passage of the 1964 Wilderness Act. The Wilderness Act led to the creation of the National Wilderness Preservation System, which protects 109 million acres of U.S. public wildlands. As one of the largest conservationist organizations in the country, The Wilderness Society has contributed to nearly all major designations of lands to be entered into the wilderness system.

Founding
The Wilderness Society was incorporated on April 30, 1937, by a group of eight men who would later become some of the 20th century's most prominent conservationists.

Founders of The Wilderness Society

 Bob Marshall: chief of recreation and lands for the United States Forest Service; 
 Aldo Leopold: noted wildlife ecologist and later author of A Sand County Almanac;
 Robert Sterling Yard: publicist for the National Park Service;
 Benton MacKaye: the "Father of the Appalachian Trail";
 Ernest Oberholtzer: proponent of the Quetico-Superior wilderness area; 
 Harvey Broome: a key player in the creation of Great Smoky Mountains National Park;
 Bernard Frank: a leader in creating the Rock Creek Watershed Association in Washington, D.C., and the Chesapeake and Ohio Canal National Historic Park in Washington, D.C., Virginia and Maryland; and
 Harold C. Anderson: a leading member of the Potomac Appalachian Trail club.

Yard became the Society's first secretary and the editor of its magazine, The Living Wilderness. Marshall, who was independently wealthy, made donations to finance the new organization. In addition, he set up a trust through his estate to provide future revenues to the Society. After he died in 1939 at age 38, The Wilderness Society began to receive such revenues.

Notable associates of The Wilderness Society
 Olaus Murie — biologist who joined the organization's governing council in 1937, and became president of the Society in 1950. Under Murie's leadership, the Society lobbied successfully for the prevention of large federal dam projects near Glacier National Park and Dinosaur National Monument. During his presidency, the Muries' ranch in Moose, Wyoming, became an unofficial headquarters for The Wilderness Society.
 Sigurd Olson — author and former president and governing council member
 Celia Hunter — founder of the Alaska Conservation Society and the first woman elected as president of the Society in 1976; previously served on the governing council
 Howard Zahniser — author of The Wilderness Act of 1964 — joined The Wilderness Society in 1945, serving for two decades, first as executive secretary and editor of the organization's magazine The Living Wilderness; later he served as the organization's executive director.
 Mardy Murie — conservationist and Alaska advocate, former governing council member. Known as the "grandmother of the conservation movement," Mardy Murie was instrumental in the designating of the Alaska National Wildlife Refuge as a protected wilderness area, and documented much of her experiences in nature, often alongside her husband Olaus, in her books, including Two in the Far North. In 1964, Mardy Murie attended the signing of the Wilderness Act by then President Lyndon Johnson.
 Gaylord Nelson — former US Senator from Wisconsin and founder of Earth Day — served as counselor to The Wilderness Society
 Wallace Stegner — author of fiction set in the West, former governing council member
 Ansel Adams — photographer and conservationist, former governing council member
 Deanna Archuleta — former southwest regional director of The Wilderness Society, former Deputy Assistant Secretary for Water and Science at the Department of Interior
Stewart M. Brandborg — executive director from 1964 to 1976 during which time more than 70 wilderness areas in 31 states were brought under the Wilderness Act's protection.
 Ernie Dickerman — focused on preserving wilderness in the eastern United States, The Wilderness Society staff from 1956 to 1976, Virginia Wilderness Committee president from 1976 to 1979, "Grandfather of Eastern Wilderness."

Achievements

The Wilderness Act of 1964
The Wilderness Act is considered one of America's bedrock conservation laws and was written by The Wilderness Society's former Executive Director Howard Zahniser. Passed by Congress in 1964, the Wilderness Act created the National Wilderness Preservation System, which now protects nearly 110 million acres of designated wilderness areas throughout the United States.  Among the first wilderness areas created by the act were:  Boundary Waters Canoe Area Wilderness, Minnesota; Bridger Wilderness, Wyoming; Bob Marshall Wilderness, Montana; and Ansel Adams Wilderness, California.

More than 109 million acres designated as wilderness
The Wilderness Society has campaigned for the passage of wilderness bills as a means to permanently protect significant and unspoiled wildlands in the United States. Since the passage of the Wilderness Act in 1964, the National Wilderness Preservation System has grown to more than 109 million acres.

Passage of conservation laws
One of The Wilderness Society's specialties is creating coalitions consisting of environmental groups, as well as representatives of sportsmen, ranchers, scientists, business owners, and others. It states that it bases its work in science and economic analysis, often enabling conservationists to strengthen the case for land protection by documenting potential scientific and economic dividends.

The Wilderness Society played a major role in passage of the following bills:
 Wilderness Act (1964)
 Wild and Scenic Rivers Act (1968)
 National Trails System Act (1968)
 Eastern Wilderness Areas Act (1975)
 National Forest Management Act (1976)
 Alaska National Interest Lands Conservation Act (1980)
 Tongass Timber Reform Act (1990)
 California Desert Protection Act (1994)
 National Wildlife Refuge System Improvement Act (1997)
 The Public Lands Omnibus Act (2009), which added wilderness areas in nine states to the wilderness system.

Significant accomplishments of The Wilderness Society
 Developed the first maps of remaining old-growth forests in the Pacific Northwest; this demonstrated the decline in such areas, and provided a factual basis for a national campaign to preserve the ancient forests of the Pacific Northwest;
 Helped gain congressional appropriations from the Land and Water Conservation Fund to add millions of acres of wildlands to local, state, and federal parks, forests, and refuges through congressional appropriations;
 Produced the first scientifically valid assessment of the status and range of Pacific salmon stocks in California, Oregon, Washington and Idaho, contributing to the emergence of salmon conservation as a major national conservation priority;
 Played a significant role in establishing forest land conservation as a priority in New England and helped organize the Northern Forest Alliance, more than 40 organizations working to preserve open space, sustainable forests, and wildlands;
 Advocated for passage of the Public Lands Omnibus Act (2009), which added wilderness areas in nine states to the wilderness system – a sweeping package of wilderness bills that protected more than 2 million acres of wilderness in nine states and thousands of miles of rivers in the wild and scenic river system;
 Successfully persuaded the government to protect sensitive habitat for caribou and other wildlife in the National Petroleum Reserve-Alaska from oil and gas drilling, and helped move a bill to Congress to protect the coastal plain of the Arctic National Wildlife Refuge;
 Gained designations of new national monuments, including: Colorado's Browns Canyon, New Mexico's Rio Grande del Norte; Washington's San Juan Islands, Colorado's Chimney Rock, and California's Fort Ord;
 Won a roll-back of numerous oil and gas leases made around Arches National Park and other wild Utah red rock lands during the end of the George W. Bush administration;
 Pushed the U.S. Bureau of Land Management to institute significant oil and gas leasing reforms, including a new planning tool, called a Master Leasing Plan, which requires a full examination of a landscape for all of its values before determining how oil and gas development can occur.

Issues and campaigns

Expanding protections for public wildlands
The Wilderness Society mobilizes public support for legislation that protects public lands through protective wildlands designations. This includes adding new wilderness areas and national monuments into U.S. public lands systems.

Wilderness Designation
The Wilderness Society supports legislation that protects unspoiled public lands as designated "Wilderness". A wilderness designation is the highest form of protection the government can give to any public land. Under The Wilderness Act, designated wilderness areas are protected, permanently, from new development, commercial activities, and motorized vehicles.

As of 2016, the wilderness system contained more than 109 million acres of protected wilderness lands. This system includes more than 750 wilderness areas in all 50 states. The Wilderness Society says it has played a part in most additions to the National Wilderness Preservation System. Recent wilderness additions include:

 Boulder White Clouds Wilderness, Idaho (2015)
 Hermosa Creek Wilderness, Colorado (2014)
 Columbine–Hondo Wilderness, New Mexico (2014)
 Alpine Lakes Wilderness expansions, Washington (2014)
 Wovoka Wilderness, Nevada (2014)

National monuments designation
The Wilderness Society works with local communities to advance efforts that protect unique historical sites, cultural areas and wildlands as national monuments. In recent years, the organization supported numerous monument designations under President Barack Obama, including:

 Katahdin Woods and Waters National Monument, Maine (2016)
 Mojave Trails, Sand to Snow and Castle Mountains national monuments, California (2016)
 Browns Canyon National Monument, Colorado (2015)
 Berryessa Snow Mountain National Monument, California (2015)
 Basin and Range National Monument, Nevada (2015)
 San Gabriel Mountains National Monument, California (2014)
 California Coastal National Monument (expansion), California (2014)
 Rio Grande del Norte National Monument, New Mexico (2013)
 San Juan Islands, Washington (2013)

Recently, the organization has come to the defense of the Antiquities Act, which has come under attack by factions in Congress. The Antiquities Act is the mechanism by which the president of the United States can designate new national monuments.

Energy development on public lands
The Wilderness Society supports steps to create clean energy and transition the nation away from dirty fossil fuels, which contribute to climate change. The organization identifies sensitive public lands and wildlife habitats that need protection from energy development and in guiding such energy development to more appropriate lands where less damage can be done to fragile ecosystems and recreation landscapes.

Guiding renewable energy
The Wilderness Society has a program that seeks to ensure that public and private lands can accommodate renewable energy development without undermining the health of the landscape or wildlife habitat.

The organization works with the Department of the Interior to guide renewable energy projects to lands that have already been used and steer projects away from sensitive areas with environmental or cultural resources. They say that energy development on US public lands should focus on degraded areas close to existing roads and power lines to reduce potential conflicts and expedite the permitting of projects.

Responsible oil and gas development
The Wilderness Society has programs that work with the government to guide oil and gas drilling away from the nation's most sensitive wildlands. The organization is concerned about the impacts oil and gas drilling is known to have on wild areas, including habitat fragmentation, water and air pollution, toxic oil spills, noise pollution and overall spoiled beauty. It identified numerous wild areas at high risk of oil development, including Southeast Utah, Colorado and Alaska's Arctic National Wildlife Refuge.

They say one of the most at-risk areas is Alaska's Arctic National Wildlife Refuge. Currently, no drilling is allowed in the refuge's fragile Arctic ecosystem, but the oil industry lobby in Washington, D.C., has pressured Congress to open the refuge to drilling. The Wilderness Society has helped move a bill to Congress that would designate the coastal plain of the refuge as wilderness. As of 2016, the bill was awaiting passage.

Mitigating climate change through reforms to federal leasing programs
The Wilderness Society supports reducing U.S. greenhouse gas emissions and mitigating climate change through legislation and administrative actions that reform the way public lands are leased and managed for oil and gas extraction. They also support reducing coal pollution through modernizing outdated leasing practices on public land, and they supported the Obama administration's 2016 moratorium of coal leasing on public lands.

The Wilderness Society also backs administrative reforms and modernized management practices to reduced methane pollution caused by leaks and venting and flaring practices on public lands.

They support modernizing the leasing fees on public lands to reflect modern energy market values.

Building new advocates for wildlands
Part of The Wilderness Society's mission is to educate the public on the values of wilderness. Recreation is only one of the benefits; others include cleaner air and water, high-quality wildlife habitat. 
To ensure that Wilderness has a future generation of advocates, The Wilderness Society does youth outreach and works with diverse groups to build the ranks of new wilderness supporters. This work has included involving youth and diverse groups in outdoor events and political advocacy. They are also engaged in a number of partnerships that support efforts to reengage communities in the outdoors through projects like the San Gabriel Mountains Leadership Academy in Southern California.

Ansel Adams collection
Renowned landscape photographer Ansel Adams was deeply involved with The Wilderness Society. Before his death in 1984, Adams selected 75 images as a gift to the organization. The national headquarters building in Washington, D.C., houses the Ansel Adams Collection of the original, signed Ansel Adams photographs. The collection was open to the public at 1615 M St., NW. Since the organization has moved, the gallery is now permanently closed.

Awards
The Wilderness Society makes several annual awards.

The Ansel Adams Award
Named for photographer and conservationist Ansel Adams, the Ansel Adams Award awarded to a current or former federal official who has been a strong advocate of conservation.

The Robert Marshall Award
The Society's most prestigious award is named in honor its principal founder, Robert Marshall. It is given to private individuals who have had notable influence upon conservation. It was first awarded in 1981 to Sigurd F. Olson, who wrote about conservation and influenced decision makers and the public.

Notable Robert Marshall Award recipients:

 Wallace Stegner, 1989 
 Celia Hunter, 1998
 Terry Tempest Williams, 2006
 Bethine Church, 2009
 William Cronon, 2014
 Elizabeth Cushman Titus Putnam, 2016

References

External links

Wilderness.net, information about wilderness, stewardship, scientific information, agency policies, and relevant legislation.
Wilderness Land Trust, purchases private land (inholdings) in existing and proposed wilderness areas.
National Landscape Conservation System, charged with the conservation and preservation of 26 million acres (105,000 km2) of public lands.
Stewart M. Brandborg Papers, University of Montana Archives

Wilderness
Environmental organizations based in Washington, D.C.
Organizations established in 1937